Jouko Antero Väänänen (born September 3, 1950 in Rovaniemi, Lapland)<ref>"CURRICULUM'VITAE." http://www.math.helsinki.fi/logic/people/jouko.vaananen/mevita.Sept2010.pdf. Department of Mathematics and Statistics University of Helsinki, FINLAND. Web. 20 Mar 2014. <http://www.math.helsinki.fi/logic/people/jouko.vaananen/mevita.Sept2010.pdf>.</ref> is a Finnish mathematical logician known for his contributions to set theory,J. Stavi and J. Väänänen, Reflection principles for the continuum. Logic and Algebra, ed. Yi Zhang, pp. 59-84, Contemporary Mathematics, Vol 302, AMS, 2002.J. Väänänen, Second order logic or set theory?, Bulletin of Symbolic Logic, 18(1), 91-121, 2012. model theory,T. Hyttinen and J. Väänänen, On Scott and Karp trees of uncountable models, Journal of Symbolic Logic55(3):897-908, 1990. logicM. Magidor and J. Väänänen, On Löwenheim-Skolem-Tarski numbers for extensions of first order logic, Journal of Mathematical Logic, 11(1), 87-113, 2011. and foundations of mathematics.J. Väänänen, Second order logic and foundations of mathematics, Bulletin of Symbolic Logic, Volume 7, Issue 4, December, 2001. He served as the vice-rector at the University of Helsinki, and a professor of mathematics at the University of Helsinki, as well as a professor of mathematical logic and foundations of mathematics at the University of Amsterdam.Jouko Väänänen at the University of Amsterdam He completed his PhD at the University of Manchester under the supervision of Peter Aczel in 1977 with the PhD thesis entitled "Applications of set theory to generalized quantifiers". He was elected to the Finnish Academy of Science and Letters in 2002.
He served as a
member of the Senate of the University of Helsinki from 2004 to 2006 and the Treasurer of the European Mathematical Society from 2007 to 2014, as well as the Treasurer of the European Set Theory Society
 since 2012.

 Publications 

 Books Dependence Logic, Cambridge University Press, 2007.Models and Games'', Cambridge University Press, 2011.

See also 

 Dependence logic

References

External links 
 Jouko Väänänen's home page
 Jouko Väänänen in mathematics genealogy

1950 births
Living people
Finnish mathematicians
Academic staff of the University of Helsinki
Academic staff of the University of Amsterdam
Alumni of the University of Manchester
People from Rovaniemi